Baek Eun-hye is a South Korean actress, model and singer. She is known for her roles in dramas such as Nokdu Flower, What's Wrong with Secretary Kim, No, Thank You and The Good Detective.

Biography and career
She was born September 1, 1986 in South Korea. She completed her studies from Sookmyung Women's University, she studied vocal music. After she graduated in 2007, she joined Big Boss Entertainment. She made her debut as an actress in 2007. After that, she has appeared in several television dramas including, Nokdu Flower, No, Thank You, The Good Detective, Black Dog: Being A Teacher and What's Wrong with Secretary Kim.

Filmography

Film

Television series

Reference

External links
 
 

1986 births
Living people
21st-century South Korean actresses
South Korean female models
South Korean television actresses
South Korean women singers
South Korean film actresses
South Korean web series actresses